The Blame is a 1924 German silent film directed by Josef Berger.

The film's art direction was by Karl Machus.

Cast
In alphabetical order

References

External links

1924 films
Films of the Weimar Republic
Films directed by Josef Berger
German silent feature films
German black-and-white films